The LORAN-C transmitter Seneca was the master station of the Northeastern United States  LORAN-C Chain (GRI 9960) and the X-Ray secondary station of the Great Lakes Chain (GRI 8970). It was located within the Seneca Army Depot in Romulus, New York, south of Geneva. It used a 1000-kilowatt, 742-foot (226.2 m) guyed mast that was constructed in 1977 and dedicated on August 2, 1978. The station was operated by United States Coast Guard and was located on a 250-acre (1.0 km2) piece of land within the 10,587-acre (42.84 km2) facility.  The transmitter was used to guide ships and aircraft up to 1,000 miles (1,600 km) away. It was the first LORAN station to use solid-state electronics versus vacuum tube components.

The station, was shut down for good on February 9, 2010 at 3:00 p.m. EST.  The tower was dismantled shortly after decommissioning of the LORAN-C system and was stacked in pieces next to the transmitter building awaiting further disposition.

External links
 http://www.tech-service.net/loran/LORAN-1.XLS
 http://www.megapulse.com/chaininfo.html

References

Military facilities in New York (state)
Seneca
Buildings and structures in Seneca County, New York
Closed facilities of the United States Coast Guard
Towers in New York (state)
United States Coast Guard Aviation
1977 establishments in New York (state)
2010 disestablishments in New York (state)